Events from the year 1866 in Germany.

Incumbents
 King of Bavaria – Ludwig II of Bavaria
 King of Prussia – William I
 King of Saxony – John

Events 

 Alfred Nobel – invents dynamite in Germany.

Births

January–March 
 10 January – Ludwig Aschoff, German physician and pathologist (d. 1942)
 28 January – Georg Friederici (d. 1947)
 February – Karl Albert Buehr, painter (d. 1952)
 6 March – Hans Christiansen, artist (d. 1947)
 7 March – Hans Fruhstorfer, German lepidopterist (d. 1922)
 13 March –  Friedrich Boedicker,  Vizeadmiral (vice admiral) (d. 1944)
 15 March – Matthew Charlton, Australian politician (d. 1948)

April–June 
 11 April – Karl Bürger , German classical scholar (d. 1936)
 22 April – Hans von Seeckt, German general (d. 1936)
 23 May– Gustav Aschaffenburg, German psychiatrist (d. 1944)
 8 June – Hermann Fenner-Behmer (d. 1913)
 26 June – Josef Swickard, German actor (d. 1940 )

July–September 
 8 July  – Benedict Friedlaender (d. 1908)
 5 August – Carl Harries, German chemist (d. 1923)
 16 September – Joe Vila, American sportswriter (d. 1934)
 24 September –Max Bernhauer, German entomologist (d. 1946 )

October–December 
 27 October – Elsa Bernstein, Austrian-German writer and dramatist of Jewish descent. (d. 1949)
 3 November – Paul Lincke, German composer (d. 1946)
 20 November– Friedrich von Berg, German politician and chairman of the Secret Civil Cabinet of Kaiser Wilhelm II (d. 1939)
 21 November – Hermann Boettcher, actor (d. 1935)
 24 November – Rudolf Biebrach, German actor and film director (d. 1938)
 12 December – Alfred Werner, German chemist, Nobel Prize laureate (d. 1919)

Deaths

January–June 
 31 January – Friedrich Rückert, German poet, translator and professor of Oriental languages (b. 1788)
 6 March – Theodor Brüggemann, Prussian government official and politician (b. 1796)

July–December 

 20 July – Bernhard Riemann, German mathematician (b. 1826)
 30 August or 10 September – Hermann Goldschmidt, German-French astronomer and painter (b. 1802)

References

 
Years of the 19th century in Germany
Germany
Germany